Sound of Music is the second studio album by punk band the Adicts, released in November 1982 by Razor Records. It was re-released by Captain Oi! Records in 2002 and by SOS Records in 2006, each with different bonus tracks. In 2002, Taang! Records reissued the album, along with Smart Alex and bonus tracks, as The Collection. The same Sound of Music disc, with bonus tracks, was released separately in 2004.

Track listing 
All songs written by Keith Warren and Pete Davison, except as noted.
 "How Sad"
 "4-3-2-1"
 "Chinese Takeaway"
 "Johnny Was a Soldier"
 "Disco"
 "Eyes in the Back of Your Head"
 "Joker in the Pack"
 "Lullaby"
 "My Baby Got Run Over by a Steamroller"
 "A Man's Gotta Do"
 "Let's Go"
 "Easy Way Out"
 "Shake Rattle, Bang Your Head"
2002 Captain Oi! CD Bonus Tracks
"You'll Never Walk Alone" (Rodgers and Hammerstein)
 "Too Young"
 "I Wanna Be Sedated" (Ramones)
2002 Taang! CD bonus tracks
"You'll Never Walk Alone" (Rodgers & Hammerstein)
 "Too Young"
 "The Odd Couple"
 "Who Spilt My Beer?"
 "Come Along"
 "I Wanna Be Sedated" (Ramones)
 "It's a Laugh"
 "Zimbabwe Brothers Are Go"
2006 SOS CD Bonus Tracks
"You'll Never Walk Alone" (Rodgers & Hammerstein)
 "Too Young"
 "Zimbabwe Brothers Are Go"
"Steamroller"

Personnel

The Adicts
 Keith "Monkey" Warren - vocals
 Pete "Pete Dee" Davison - guitar  
 Mel "Spider" Ellis - bass
 Michael "Kid Dee" Davison - drums

Release history

References

1982 albums
The Adicts albums